Charles Kenneth Johnson (July 24, 1924 – March 19, 2001) was, from 1972 until his death, the president of the International Flat Earth Research Society, which he and his wife ran from their home in California. He claimed that the Apollo Moon landings, and space exploration in general, were faked to lead people away from the biblical truth that the world was flat.

Biography 
According to Johnson, he had doubted the round earth theory since an elementary school teacher tried, unsuccessfully, to teach him about gravity.

Originally an airplane mechanic in San Francisco, Johnson took over the Society from Samuel Shenton on the latter's death in 1972, from his ranch, near Edwards Air Force Base. While president, his organization had only around 200 members in 1980. Johnson once said that "if earth were a ball spinning in space, there would be no up or down."

In his obituary, Tim Bullamore wrote, "Although the world at large was slow to accept his work, Johnson remained cheerful and unruffled. He enjoyed smoking a cigar while watching the sun set over the flat desert. He was regularly interviewed by curious journalists and was often invited to speak about his subject. He received large quantities of mail, not all of it ridiculing his work, and on one occasion he starred in an ice-cream advertisement."

References

External links
 The Flat-out Truth: Earth Orbits? Moon Landings? A Fraud! Says This Prophet. Robert J. Schadewald. Science Digest, July 1980. Detailed profile of Johnson and the Society.
 The International Flat Earth Research Society. Robert P. J. Day, 1993. Includes a promotional flyer written by Johnson. Part of the talk.origins archive on the Evolution/Creationism archive.

1924 births
2001 deaths
Moon landing conspiracy theorists
Flat Earth proponents
American conspiracy theorists